WCLE may refer to:

 WCLE (AM), a radio station (1570 AM) licensed to Cleveland, Tennessee, United States
 WCLE-FM, a radio station (104.1 FM) licensed to Calhoun, Tennessee, United States